The northern black racer (Coluber constrictor constrictor) is a subspecies of the eastern racer (Coluber constrictor), a nonvenomous snake in the family Colubridae. Their geographic range extends from southern Maine to northern Georgia and westward to central Kentucky and eastern Ohio. Their occupancy is dependent on the availability of large patches of open habitats.

Geographic range
Coluber constrictor constrictor ranges from Georgia, Alabama, and Mississippi in the south, to central New York, Vermont, New Hampshire, and Maine in the north, to Tennessee, Kentucky, and eastern Ohio in the west. At the southern end of its range, it overlaps with Coluber constrictor priapus, the southern black racer, and at the westward end it overlaps with Coluber constrictor flaviventris, the eastern yellow-bellied racer.

Symbol

The northern black racer is the state reptile of Ohio.

Gallery

References

Colubrids
Snakes of North America
Reptiles of the United States
Fauna of the Eastern United States
Reptiles of Mexico
Reptiles of Canada
Symbols of Ohio
Reptiles described in 1758
Taxa named by Carl Linnaeus